For season 15 of Deutschland sucht den Superstar, Dieter Bohlen announced a new jury consisting of Carolin Niemczyk, Ella Endlich and Mousse T. The winner was the 16-year-old Marie Wegener. She is the youngest winner ever and only the fourth woman to win the show and the first to win against a male in the top two. Michel Truog was the runner-up and Michael Rauscher reached the third place.

Finalists
The finalist were announced at 7 April and consisted of six male and four female contestants.

"Mottoshows" (theme shows)

Color key

Top 10 - Discofox
Original airdate: 14 April 2018

Top 8 - Mein Lieblingssong (My Favorite Song)
Original airdate: 21 April 2018

Top 6 - Semi-Final: Alt und Neu (Old and New)
Original airdate: 28 April 2018

Top 4 - Finale (Solo song & Winner's single)
Original airdate: 5 May 2018
The final result was announced after all four contestants performed their two songs.

Elimination chart

References

External links 
 Official website

Season 15
2018 in German music
2018 German television seasons